E 533 is a European B class road in Germany and Austria, connecting the cities Munich — Garmisch-Partenkirchen — Mittenwald — Seefeld in Tirol — Innsbruck.

Route and E-road junctions
  (on shared signage  then )
 Garmisch-Partenkirchen
 Mittenwald
  (on shared signage  B 177 then )
 Seefeld in Tirol
 Innsbruck: ,

External links 
 UN Economic Commission for Europe: Overall Map of E-road Network (2007)
 International E-road network

533